Various Christian denominations do not consider homosexuality or transgender identity to be sins. These include entire denominations, as well as individual churches and congregations. Some are composed mainly of non-LGBT members and also have specific programs to welcome LGBT people, while others are composed mainly of LGBT members. Additionally, some denominations which are not LGBT-affirming include LGBT member-organized groups which are not officially sanctioned by the denominations themselves. There are also ecumenical or parachurch programmes that explicitly outreach to LGBT people but do not identify with any particular church, tradition, or denomination.

History

The history of Christianity and homosexuality has been much debated. The Hebrew Bible and its traditional interpretations in Judaism and Christianity have historically affirmed and endorsed a patriarchal and heteronormative approach towards human sexuality, favouring exclusively penetrative vaginal intercourse between men and women within the boundaries of marriage over all other forms of human sexual activity, including autoeroticism, masturbation, oral sex, non-penetrative and non-heterosexual sexual intercourse (all of which have been labeled as "sodomy" at various times), believing and teaching that such behaviors are forbidden due to their sinfulness, and further compared to or derived from the behavior of the alleged residents of Sodom and Gomorrah. However, the status of LGBT people in early Christianity is debated.

While throughout the majority of Christian history, most Christian theologians and denominations have considered homosexual behavior as immoral or sinful. Today, various Christian denominations are accepting of homosexuality and transgender identity and inclusive of homosexual and transgender people, such as the United Church of Christ and the Metropolitan Community Church. Formed in 1991, The Evangelical Network is a network of evangelical churches, ministries and Christian Workers that are a part of the LGBT community. The Evangelical Network holds an annual conference and provides education, ministerial support, and networking capabilities.

in the 19th century, John Church (minister) was considered to be the first minister to openly perform same sex marriages in his English church. In 1946, Archbishop George Hyde of the Eucharistic Catholic Communion (a small denomination not in union with the Roman Catholic Church) celebrated mass for gay men in Atlanta. In 1956, the Church of ONE Brotherhood was founded in Los Angeles by a gay-rights activist. In 1962, a Congregationalist pastor began an overt pastoral ministry to gay people in New York City.  The first gay and transgender-specific denomination, as opposed to individual congregations, was the Universal Fellowship of Metropolitan Community Churches in 1968.

Some congregations are merely non-discriminatory and LGBT-affirming while others, albeit incredibly rare, are specifically oriented toward gay, lesbian, bisexual, and transgender persons. Some congregations, especially those designated as "Welcoming churches" in the United Church of Christ, Episcopal, and Brethren/Mennonite, and Quaker denominations, may consist of a large number of gay, lesbian, bisexual, and transgender members.

While Unitarian Universalism is no longer explicitly a Christian religion, it does have Judeo-Christian roots. Both the Unitarian Universalist Association and the Canadian Unitarian Council have officially affirmed LGBT people and have openly advocated for gay rights.

Denominations

International 
 Association of Welcoming and Affirming Baptists
 Affirming Pentecostal Church International

Africa 
 Anglican Church of Southern Africa NOTE: The Anglican church defines marriage as between a man and a woman, but does allow for the ordination of gay and lesbian clergy. Bishop Mervyn Castle of False Bay was openly gay and celibate. Also, for lay people, "Anglican bishops from across southern Africa have resolved that gay and lesbian partners who enter same-sex civil unions under South African law should be welcomed into congregations as full members of the church." The Diocese of Saldanha Bay has proposed the blessing of same-sex unions with the bishop's support.
 Deo Gloria Global Apostolic Network in South Africa
 Uniting Reformed Church in Southern Africa (Southern Synod)
 Dutch Reformed Church in South Africa (NGK) NOTE: Each congregation may determine its own decision on gay marriage and gay ministers.  However, in November 2016 the Extraordinary Synod formally defined marriage as "a commitment between one man and one woman" and gay sex as a sin. Congregations are allowed to deny employment to married gays, but also allowed to define their own position. However, on 8 March 2019 a Pretoria high court judgment overturned the Dutch Reformed Church's decision not to recognise same-sex unions within the church. The Church decided not to appeal the decision.  [96]
Methodist Church of Southern Africa NOTE: The church "accepts same-sex relationships (as long as such relationships are not...marriage)".
 Uniting Presbyterian Church in Southern Africa NOTE: Each minister may exercise his or her conscience and support same-sex unions.

Asia 
 Aglipayan Church – officially known as Iglesia Filipina Independiente or Philippine Independent Church, an Independent Catholic and Anglo-Catholic denomination. The church has adopted an official and binding position of inclusion and full acceptance of LGBT individuals and organizations since 2017 after the question of inclusiveness was raised in an official leadership meeting by a gay member of the church in 2014. Its youth organization wing has also repeatedly elected presidents, vice presidents, and executives who belong to the Filipino LGBT youth sector. On February 24, 2023, the church ordained Wylard "Wowa" Ledama, a transwoman, to the diaconate as the church's first trans clergy.
 Anglican Church of Korea NOTE: The Anglican church has some clergy and congregations that support LGBT rights.
 Church of South India NOTE: The CSI opened ordination to transgender persons, has ministries specifically for transgender rights and some clergy support gay rights. The CSI is among the Anglican churches that "are open to changing Church doctrine on marriage in order to allow for same-sex unions" according to the BBC. 
 Evangelical Church of India
 United Church of Christ in Japan
 United Church of Christ in the Philippines

North America

Anglican

 Episcopal Church (United States)
 Evangelical Anglican Church In America

Baptist
 Alliance of Baptists
 Cooperative Baptist Fellowship NOTE: Each congregation determines its own position

Catholic
American National Catholic Church
 Ecumenical Catholic Church
 Ecumenical Catholic Communion
 Evangelical Catholic Church
 Old Catholic Church
 Traditionalist Mexican-American Catholic Church

Lutheran
 Evangelical Lutheran Church in America: the ELCA's document A Social Statement on Human Sexuality: Gift and Trust  notes "While Lutherans hold various convictions regarding lifelong, monogamous, same-gender relationships, this church is united on many critical issues. It opposes all forms of verbal or physical harassment and assault based on sexual orientation. It supports legislation and policies to protect civil rights and to prohibit discrimination in housing, employment, and public services. It has called upon congregations and members to welcome, care for, and support same-gender couples and their families and to advocate for their legal protection."
 Evangelical Lutheran Church in Canada

Methodist
 United Methodist Church's General Conference, voted forward a conservative "Traditional plan", defeating the more liberal "One Church plan." No discretion is allowed to ordain gay, lesbian, or bisexual clergy in same-gender relationships, or marry gay couples. There is no prohibition on the ordination of transgender clergy and the Judicial Council ruled, in 2007, that transgender clergy can remain ordained. The United Methodist News Service reiterated that there is no rule against transgender clergy. The vote on the "Traditional Plan" was 53 percent in favor to 47 opposed. The Judicial Council reviewed the plan and upheld 10 petitions while declaring 7 petitions, approximately 40 percent of the plan, unconstitutional. UMC's Book of Discipline  Article 4. [Inclusiveness of the Church] includes this statement: "All persons without regard to race, color, national origin, status, or economic condition, shall be eligible to attend its worship services... " and later, within part 304.4: "The practice of homosexuality is incompatible with Christian teaching. Therefore self-avowed practicing homosexuals are not to be certified as candidates, ordained as ministers, or appointed to serve in The United Methodist Church." Previously, Annual Conferences had affirmed LGBT clergy and relationships through resolutions. The South Carolina Annual Conference had passed a resolution supporting transgender rights. The Western Jurisdiction elected the denomination's first openly and partnered lesbian bishop in 2016. The North Central Jurisdiction considered an openly gay nominee for bishop although not elected. Additionally, the Northeastern Jurisdiction passed a resolution supporting the option of allowing same-sex marriages. On May 7, 2018, the Council of Bishops in the United Methodist Church, had proposed allowing individual pastors and regional church bodies to decide whether to ordain LGBT clergy and perform same-sex weddings, which came to be known as the One Church plan.  Their proposal was rejected by the February 26, 2019 General Conference vote. The highest level of the United Methodist Church will now strengthen punishments for 1) pastors who are non-celibate gay people, or 2) pastors who perform same-sex weddings. Nevertheless, the Western Jurisdiction, the German Central Conference, and other annual conferences within other jurisdictions have announced that they will not enforce the Traditional Plan and some of these have continued to ordain LGBTQ clergy, for example methodist lesbian bishop Karen Oliveto and methodist gay bishop Cedrick Bridgeforth.
 United Church of Canada shares both the Methodist and Reform traditions.  In 1925, Canadian Methodist Church, Canada, Congregationalists and some churches of the Presbyterian Church in Canada united to form the United Church of Canada.  Within the United Church of Canada, congregations decide if they are Affirming or if they perform same sex marriages. Over 150 United Church congregations are either Affirming or are in the process of becoming Affirming congregations.

Pentecostal
 Global Alliance of Affirming Apostolic Pentecostals
 Gay Apostolic Pentecostals

Protestant
 Presbyterian Church (USA)

Reformed
 Christian Church (Disciples of Christ)
 Reformed Church in America NOTE: Gay pastors may serve congregations if they were ordained in another denomination; some member churches allow gay marriage.
 United Church of Christ
 United Church of Canada NOTE: Each individual congregation decides for itself whether or not to be affirming or to solemnize same sex marriages. Over 150 United Church congregations are either Affirming or are in the process of becoming Affirming congregations. There are a number of other church bodies (some Presbyteries and Conferences) that have been designated as Affirming.

Other 
 
 Community of Christ
 Disciples of Christ
 Ecclesia Gnostica
 Friends General Conference (Quakers)
 International Council of Community Churches
 Mennonite Church Canada NOTE: Each congregation determines its own position
 Mennonite Church USA NOTE: Each conference determines its own position
 Metropolitan Community Church
 Moravian Church in America Northern Province
 National Association of Congregational Christian Churches NOTE: Each congregation is free to determine its own policy
 Restoration Church of Jesus Christ (Salt Lake City, Utah, US) —Not affliated with the Church of Jesus Christ of Latter-Day Saints
 Swedenborgian Church of North America
 Unitarian Universalist Association NOTE: Although no longer exclusively Christian, the denomination originated as such and is 'mainline'
 Unity Church
Spiritualism

Europe 
 Austria, Germany, Netherlands and Switzerland Old Catholic Church
 Austria: Evangelical Church of the Augsburg Confession in Austria
 Belgium: United Protestant Church in Belgium
 Croatia: Evangelical (Lutheran) Church in Croatia
 Czech Republic: Českobratrská církev evangelická (The Evangelical Church of Czech Brethren)
 Czech Republic: Čeští kvakeři, z. s. (Quakers)
 Czech Republic: Starokatolická církev v České republice (Old Catholic Church)
 Denmark: Church of Denmark
 France: United Protestant Church of France
 Finland: Evangelical Lutheran Church of Finland NOTE: The church permits prayers of celebration following a civil union or marriage 
 Germany: German Lutheran, reformed and united churches in Evangelical Church in Germany
 Germany: The Social Ethics Ministry of the Central Conference of the United Methodist Church in Germany
 Germany: Catholic Diocese of the Old Catholics in Germany
 Iceland: Church of Iceland
 Italy: Lutheran Evangelical Church in Italy (CELI)
 Italy: Union of Methodist and Waldensian Churches
 Ireland: Church of Ireland NOTE: Two former archbishops of Dublin, two diocesan bishops, and several congregations affirm LGBTI people in the Republic.
 Ireland: Non-subscribing Presbyterian Church of Ireland
 Ireland: Unitarian Church in Ireland
 Netherlands: Protestant Church in the Netherlands NOTE: to be decided by the local church council, a map exists showing local churches affirming LGBT 
 Netherlands: Remonstrantse Broederschap 
 Netherlands: Mennonite Church in the Netherlands
 Nordic and Baltic Episcopal Area Conferences of the United Methodist Church
 Norway: Church of Norway
 Poland: Christian United Church in Poland
 Spain: Spanish Reformed Episcopal Church and Spanish Evangelical Church
 Sweden: 
 Church of Sweden
 Switzerland: 
 Evangelical Lutheran Church in Geneva (Genf)
 Offene Kirche Elisabethen - LSBK Lesbische und Schwule Basis Kirche 
 Regenbogenkirche, a project of the Evangelisch-methodistischen Kirche Adliswil-Zürich 2
 Swiss reformed churches in Swiss Reformed Church
 United Kingdom (UK)
Church of England NOTE: The church defines marriage as between a man and a woman, but also supports same-sex civil partnerships. "The church has no truck with homophobia and even supports clergy who are in civil partnerships." The C of E allows prayers to follow a civil same-sex marriage, and allows civil partnerships for gay priests. In 2016 the Bishop of Grantham, Nicholas Chamberlain, came out as the first openly gay bishop in a relationship. The C of E voted to affirm transgender people. The church approved services to celebrate and mark a person's gender transition. 
Church in Wales NOTE: A majority supports same-sex marriage; the church said LGBT people can be “honest and open, respected and affirmed”. The church also permits gay priests to enter into civil partnerships. The church voted to explore approving same-sex marriages and blessings for civil partnerships.
Church of Ireland congregations in Northern Ireland may be affirming NOTE: the denomination remains in conversation as a whole; in 2011, a senior cleric entered into a same-sex civil partnership and kept his post. 
Scottish Episcopal Church.
Church of Scotland NOTE: The Church of Scotland allows its ministers to enter into same-sex marriages and voted to permit ministers to conduct same-sex weddings.
The Religious Society of Friends (Quakers) NOTE: Not all Quakers view themselves as Christian; they are however an historically Christian religious group.
International Council of Community Churches
Methodist Church of Great Britain NOTE: The Methodist Conference voted to permit same-sex marriages on Methodist premises by ministers.
Unitarian and Free Christian Churches
United Ecumenical Catholic Church
United Reformed Church
Open Episcopal Church

Latin America 

 Argentina - Evangelical Church of the River Plate
 Argentina - United Evangelical Lutheran Church
 Argentina - Evangelical Methodist Church in Argentina
 Brazil - Anglican Episcopal Church of Brazil
 Brazil - Christian Community of God (Authenticists)
 Brazil - Anglican Episcopal Church of Brazil (since 1998)
 Brazil - Evangelical Church of the Lutheran Confession in Brazil
 Brazil - United Presbiterian Church
 Chile - Evangelical Lutheran Church of Chile
 Chile - Lutheran Church in Chile
 Colombia - Methodist Church of Colombia Openly LGBTQ+ pastors may serve in churches and also same-sex/same-gender weddings can be celebrated.
 Costa Rica - Costa Rican Lutheran Church
 Costa Rica - Episcopal Church of Costa Rica
 Cuba - Episcopal Church of Cuba
 El Salvador - Episcopal Anglican Church of El Salvador
 Peru - Lutheran Church of Peru
 Mexico - Anglican Church of Mexico NOTE: The Church currently defines marriage between a man and a woman. Clergy have been allowed to be on same sex relationships. On 2020, three bishops released a statement explaining that they are discussing issues related to the LGBT community and church teaching, and are working towards a common understanding. One bishop has openly spoken in support of same sex marriage, and became the first Anglican bishop in the country to participate along his diocese in an LGBT Pride Parade in 2021.
 Mexico - Metropolitan Community Churches in Mexico
 Mexico - Ecumenical Catholic Church
 Mexico - Mision Cristiana Incluyente 
 Uruguay - Evangelical Church of Uruguay

Australia 
 Affirming congregations within the Anglican Church of Australia NOTE: The Diocese of Perth, and other bodies, have voted to support same-sex relationships The Diocese of Gippsland appointed an openly and partnered gay priest. Though the Anglican Church of Australia does not have an official policy on homosexuality, in the Seventeenth Session of the General Synod of the Anglican Church of Australia in 2017, the Anglican Church of Australia passed a motion recognising "that the doctrine of our church, in line with traditional Christian teaching, is that marriage is an exclusive and lifelong union of a man and a woman, and further, recognises that this has been the subject of several General Synod resolutions over the past fifteen years". In 2018, the Primate of Australia and Archbishop of Melbourne, Philip Freier, released an ad clerum reiterating the current position that clergy cannot perform a same-sex marriage. 
 Uniting Church in Australia
 United Ecumenical Catholic Church in Australia
 Metropolitan Community Church
 Religious Society of Friends (Quakers)
 Baptist Church of Australia - some Baptist congregations in Australia
 Universal Church of Love, Peace & Equality Inc

New Zealand 
Anglican Church in New Zealand NOTE: As of 2018, clergy may bless a same-sex union. In 2014, the Anglican church voted to start a process toward allowing the blessing of same-sex relationships. The Dunedin Diocese already offers a "Liturgy for the Blessing of a Relationship" irrespective of gender. The Anglican province has approved of allowing clergy "'to recognise in public worship' a same-gender civil union or state marriage of members of their faith community" with the bishop's permission.
Metropolitan Community Church in New Zealand
Presbyterian Church in Aotearoa New Zealand NOTE: Individual congregations may be affirming, but the denomination is not affirming.
Methodist Church in New Zealand
Uniting Congregations in New Zealand NOTE: Individual congregations may be affirming, but the denomination is not affirming. 
Religious Society of Friends (Quakers) in New Zealand
Community of Christ (The Reorganized Church of Jesus Christ of Latter Day Saints) in Auckland, and Christchurch, New Zealand. Not affiliated with the Church of Jesus Christ of Latter-Day Saints.
Open Table Ministries in Auckland, New Zealand
Some Baptist Churches - Ponsonby Baptist Church, and Cityside Baptist Church (Mt Eden), both in Auckland, New Zealand.
Auckland Rainbow Community Church

Individual churches and congregations 
 AChurch4Me  (Chicago, Illinois, US)
 New Day Worship Center (Toccoa, Georgia, US)
 Blessed Ministry Community Church (Hong Kong)
 Broadway United Methodist Church (Indianapolis, Indianapolis, US)
 Cathedral of Hope (Dallas, Texas, US)
 Citichurch of Dallas (Dallas, Texas, US)
 City United Reformed Church (Cardiff, Wales)
 Christ Chapel of the Valley (Los Angeles, California, US) - a member of the evangelical Christ Chapel Association of Churches
 Christ Church Cathedral (Anglican Church of Australia)
 Chewelah United Church of Christ, Chewelah, Washington website
 Christ Church Cathedral (Church of Ireland)
 Christ the Solid Rock Baptist Church in Madison (National Baptist Convention, USA Inc.)
 Church of St. Luke and The Epiphany (Philadelphia, Pennsylvania, US) - Episcopal 
 Church of the Valley (Van Nuys, California, US) - Christian Church (Disciples of Christ)
 Danish Church of Buenos Aires, Argentina
 EastLake Community Church (Bothell, Washington, US)
 First Presbyterian Church (Philadelphia, Pennsylvania). 
 Free Community Church (Singapore, Singapore)
 Garneau United Church (Edmonton, Alberta, Canada). Church website.
 Glendale City Seventh-day Adventist Church (Glendale, California, US)
 Glendale United Methodist Church (Nashville, TN, US). Church website
 Glide Memorial Church (San Francisco, California, US)
 Hollywood Adventist Church (Los Angeles, California, US)
 Kabahaghari United Methodists of the Philippines
 Khandallah Presbyterian Church
 Open Bible Church
 Orthodox Episcopal Church of God
 Grace Gospel Chapel (Seattle, Washington, US)
 Seattle First Baptist Church (Seattle, Washington, US)
 Hagia Sophia Gnostic Church (Seattle, Washington, US) - Ecclesia Gnostica
 Light of Love Fellowship (St. Louis, Missouri, US)
 McDougall United Church (Edmonton, Alberta, Canada).
 Mayfair Presbyterian Church (Chicago, Illinois, US)
 Millwoods United Church (Edmonton, Alberta, Canada).  Church website.
 Misión San Francisco de Asís in the Anglican Church of Mexico
 Náboženská obec Církve československé husitské v Brně-Maloměřicích (street Selská 16/53, Brno, Moravia, Czech Republic)
 One Church (Chandler, Arizona, US)
 Oriented to Christ (Hong Kong)
 Pullen Memorial Baptist Church (Raleigh, North Carolina, US)
 Journey Community Church, Downpatrick and Antrim, (Northern Ireland, UK)
 Riverside Church at Park and King (Jacksonville, Florida, US). Church website
 Robertson-Wesley United Church (Edmonton, Alberta, Canada).
 Sherwood Park United Church (Sherwood Park, Alberta, Canada). Church website.
 Southminster-Steinhauer United Church (Edmonton, Alberta, Canada). Church website.
 Southwark Cathedral (Church of England)
 Spirit of Joy Christian Church (Lakeville, Minnesota, US) - Christian Church (Disciples of Christ)
St. Aidan of Lindisfarne Celtic Church Maui, Hawaii
 St. Albert United Church (St. Alberta, Alberta, Canada)
 St. Andrew's Church, Subiaco, Perth, Australia in the Anglican Diocese of Perth
 St. Andrew's Church on the Terrace in the Presbyterian Church of Aotearoa New Zealand
 St. Andrew's United Church (Spruce Grove, Alberta, Canada). Church website. 
 St. Andrew's United Church (Lacombe, Alberta, Canada). Church website.
 St. David's Presbyterian Church in Auckland
 St. John's and St. Andrew's at Waterloo (Church of England)
 St. John's Cathedral (Anglican Church of Australia)
 St. John's in the City
 St. Mark's Anglican Church (Guadalajara, Jalisco, Mexico) - a bilingual congregation
 St. Barnabas, Bethnal Green - Diocese of London (Church of England)
 St. Mary, London (Church of England) 
 St. Mary and St. Nicholas, Spalding (Church of England)
 St. Mary's Battersea (Church of England)
 St. Pancras Church (Church of England)
 St. Patrick's Cathedral (Church of Ireland)
 Tong-Kwang Light House Presbyterian Church (Taipei, Taiwan)
 University Baptist Church (Austin, Texas, US)
 St. Paul's Anglican Church (Vancouver, British Columbia, Canada)
 St. Paul's United Church (Edmonton, Alberta, Canada)
 Wake Forest Baptist Church (Winston-Salem, North Carolina, US)
 Walnut Creek United Methodist Church (Walnut Creek, California, US)
 Living Spirit United Methodist Church (Minneapolis, Minnesota, US)
 Greenland Hills United Methodist Church (Dallas, Texas, US)
 Ekklesia Tou Theou (Church of God) (Cavite, Philippines)
 Olivet-Schwenkfelder United Church of Christ (East Norriton, Pennsylvania, US)
 Red Willow Community Church (Seventh-day Adventist) (St. Albert, Alberta, Canada)
 Open Doors Community Church (Seoul, South Korea)
 Trinity Episcopal Church (St. Louis, Missouri, US)
 Unity Fellowship of Christ Church (Los Angeles, California, US)
 York Minster (Church of England)
Cityside Baptist Church (Mt Eden) in Auckland, New Zealand
Ponsonby Baptist Church in Auckland, New Zealand

Denomination-sanctioned programmes
The following denominations have LGBT-welcoming or affirming programmes, though not all churches within the denomination are necessarily members of the LGBT programme.
 Integrity and the OASIS are parachurch ministries, but operate under the official roof of the Episcopal Church (United States) and the Anglican Church of Canada. There are also official programmes identifying parishes in some dioceses.
Supportive Communities Network — Church of the Brethren, Mennonite Church USA, and Mennonite Church Canada
 Open and Affirming — Christian Church (Disciples of Christ): Open and Affirming.
 Alliance Q — Christian Church (Disciples of Christ)
 Welcoming Community Network (WCN). — Community of Christ
 Reconciling in Christ — Evangelical Lutheran Church in America and Evangelical Lutheran Church in Canada
 More Light — Presbyterian Church (USA)
 Room for All — Reformed Church in America
 Affirm United/S'affirmer Ensemble — United Church of Canada
 Open and Affirming (ONA) — United Church of Christ
 Friends for Lesbian, Gay, Bisexual, Transgender, and Queer Concerns

Unofficial programmes
Axios – an unofficial Orthodox-Christian association for LGBT Orthodox-Christians and same-sex-marriage activists working to promote recognition of same-sex marriage in the Church.
 Affirmation: Gay & Lesbian Mormons – Latter-day Saints
 Call to Action – Roman Catholic Church
 Changing Attitude (International) – group working for LGBT affirmation within the Anglican Communion. Conducts worship, training and workshops.
 Changing Attitude (UK) – same as above but particularly for the Church of England.
 DignityUSA – Roman Catholic Church. Works for inclusiveness but is not associated with particular congregations, nor is supported by the Church hierarchy. A separate organisation called Courage International promotes chastity amongst LGBT Catholics, and is supported by the Church hierarchy as it submits to the Church's official position on homosexuality.
 Fortunate Families – Roman Catholic Church
 Inclusive Church (multi-denominational, but principally Church of England/Anglican) – working for a range of inclusion within the Anglican Communion.
 Reconciling Ministries Network — United Methodist Church
 SDA Kinship International — Seventh-day Adventist Church
 Welcoming and Affirming — Baptist
 Covenant Network (Pentecostal) – Pentecostal
 Pink Menno Campaign — Mennonite Church USA
 GALA (Gay and Lesbian Acceptance) – Community of Christ. An unofficial organization of LGBT members of the church.
 Emergence International – Christian Science. An unofficial organization for LGBT members of the movement.
 The Fellowship of Reconciling Pentecostals International – Pentecostal

Programmes not affiliated with any particular denomination
 Accepting Evangelicals – Evangelical parishes accepting LGBT people
 Believe Out Loud – an online network that empowers Christians to work for lesbian, gay, bisexual and transgender (LGBT) equality.
 Created Gay/Created Queer is a web ministry for LGBT+ Christians and their allies. Created Gay/Created Queer features LGBT+ focused sermons and devotionals, hundreds of resource links, book and movie reviews, and discussions of key Bible passages. 
 European Forum of Lesbian, Gay, Bisexual and Transgender Christian Groups
 Evangelical Fellowship for Lesbian and Gay Christians (UK)
 Evangelicals Concerned: Gay and Transgender Christians
 Freedom2b is an Australian-based organisation that assists LGBTI people from Christian backgrounds on their journey to reconciling their faith, sexuality and gender identity.
 gaychurch.org: Ministering to LGBTQI Christians and friends of our community around the globe. We feature the largest welcoming and affirming Christian church directory in the world.
 Institute for Welcoming Resources (a programme of the National LGBTQ Task Force)
 LGBT Christians: Ukrainian multi-denominational organization
 LGBT Faith Leaders of African Descent (FLoAD)
 Logos Česká republika, z. s.
 Nuntiare et Recreare: Russian multi-denominational organization
 OneBodyOneFaith, formerly the Lesbian and Gay Christian Movement (UK)
 Q Christian Fellowship (QCF) is a "nonprofit ministry supporting Christians worldwide who happen to be lesbian, gay, bisexual, or transgender (LGBT)". QCF is an ecumenical ministry, welcoming Christians from a wide variety of backgrounds. QCF was founded in 2001 as The Gay Christian Network (GCN).
Reformation Project  Non-profit organization seeking greater inclusion of LGBT lay members and clergy in mainstream Christian churches.
 Strength in Weakness Ministry
 Sybils: UK group for transgender Christians
 TalkToTheWord LGBT-sensitive Parsed Interactive Bible PIB by talktotheword.com
 The Evangelical Network
 The NALT (Not All Like That) Christians
 Transfaith Online

Defunct denominations
 United Order Family of Christ
 Restoration Church of Jesus Christ

See also

Blessing of same-sex unions in Christian churches
List of Christian denominational positions on homosexuality
List of LGBT-related organizations, including religious organizations
LGBT-affirming religious groups
Social Gospel

References

External links

LGBT-related lists
LGBT and Christianity
Lists of Christian denominations
Organizations that support LGBT people